Sambhali Trust (in Hindi, Sambhali means "strenghening of the deprived") is a nonprofit organisation based in Jodhpur, India. Founded in 2007, the organisation aims to empower Dalit women and children in Rajasthan through educational programs, vocational training, and social services. 

The trust is active in Jodhpur, Setrawa and Jaisalmer and reaches approximately 800 people per year. Since its founding, it has worked with more than 12,000 children and women in Western Rajasthan.

History
Sambhali Trust was founded on 16 January 2007 by Govind Singh Rathore, after experiencing violence and discrimination against the women of his family. 

Hence, Sambhali Trust was created to help alleviate Rajasthani women out of poverty and financial dependence on their families. This was initially done by creating a platform to teach basic Hindi, English, Mathematics and sewing for free to women and girls in Jodhpur, and later Setrawa and Jaisalmer, through "empowerment centres". The aim of this training is to enable women and girls to acquire the skills and knowledge required to find or create employment for themselves. 

On 23 July 2015, Sambhali Trust was granted Special Consultative Status by the United Nations Economic and Social Council (ECOSOC).

Structure
The trust now consists of 20 projects: nine empowerment centres, two sewing centres, two educational programs and scholarship funding, the "No Bad Touch" and "Aadarsh - Save Youth, Save Nation" projects, one Rural Schools Project, one women's shelter service, one self-help group and a toll-free helpline. Each project is headed by a project manager, with additional support from subject teachers or assistants. 10 teachers in Hindi and Sewing, many of them graduates of the Sambhali program themselves, are employed by the trust, with approximately 15-30 other teachers working on a voluntary basis from all over the world. Predominantly, these volunteers teach English and Mathematics with some specialising in fashion and design and others working within the administration of the trust.

The trust has seven trustees, with Govind Singh Rathore acting as Managing Trustee. A national and international advisory board also partake in decision making.

Sambhali Trust is financed mainly through foreign donations and grants. Since 2013, the Trust has been affiliated with Austrian, German, Swiss and British sister organisations. Nowadays, Sambhali's Associates are Sambhali Austria, Sambhali Germany, Sambhali U.S., Sambhali France and Sambhali UK respectively. Donations through these sister organisations are all directed to the central, Indian based Trust.

Projects

Empowerment Centers 

Located across Jodhpur, Setrawa and Jaisalmer, empowerment Centers are the core projects of Sambhali Trust. These centers provide underprivileged women from deprived areas of Jodhpur an opportunity to have a good primary education and vocational skill training in sewing and embroidery. This enables women to manufacture their own products after training or to go on and work for Sambhali Trust in the sewing centers. The sewing centers employ over 20 women to produce handmade fashion and accessories for the Sambhali Boutique, based in Jodhpur, as well as bespoke orders overseas.

Boarding Homes 

Many underprivileged girls have the potential to be exceptional students but aren’t given the opportunity or encouragement to explore their capabilities and discover their unique talents, especially if they live in rural areas. Their parents bring them to Sambhali for better and healthy living and education, which their parents are not able to provide in their living circumstances.

At the three Sambhali Boarding Homes girls in elementary secondary school and young women in college receive a good education, free meals and accommodation, daily tutoring, computer training, develop self-defense and leadership skills.

Self-Help (microfinance) Groups  

This project was established in October 2009 to help women, by providing them with a means of saving money and having access to loans, thus enabling them to create small enterprises of their own and work towards financial independence.  Under this programme women are given financial and business management training. 
 
Currently, the programme includes around 85% Dalit women, many of whom are widows, whose husbands have died working in the stone quarries, a common but dangerous occupation in the area.

Scholarship Programme 

The Sambhali Scholarship Programme was established initially to enable children of the women who attend Sambhali’s empowerment centers to receive an education. Children are sponsored through individual scholarships provided by donors worldwide to go to a good local school. 

Sambhali Trust funds over 190 children to attend school in Jodhpur through a scholarship program and boarding home.

Primary Education Centers  

Primary Education Centers are the centers for children who are educationally-deprived that provide interesting audio-visual techniques to encourage children to attend school. The centers also support children who go to school by completing their homework and other school related activities after their school hours.

Nirbhaya HelpLine  

Launched in 2014, the toll-free Nirbhaya HelpLine aimed to assist women and girls by providing services directly to survivors of violence with a focus on domestic violence, sexual abuse, harassment, rape, and acid attacks or through providing referrals to other agencies.

SOS Helpline  

Sambhali aims to provide an Emergency Medical and Legal Support Service which helps women (and their families) throughout Rajasthan, who are unable to afford emergency medical treatment or legal representation.

Sambhali Boutique  

The Trust has set up Sambhali Boutique to enhance the ability of the women and adolescent girls graduating from our Empowerment Centres to support themselves and their families. Most of these women had over a year of training, with the help of national and international trainers. These women have lived in poverty, and most of their literacy comes from participating in Sambhali Trust programs. Yet, these women are fighters who did not accept staying home and limiting their lives to looking after their households.

Every product sold at Sambhali Boutique has a story and dream related to it from these women.

Garima (LGBTQIA+ rights) 

Project Garima offers a safe drop-in center for the Members of the LGBTQIA+ community.

The project organises professional support for the members who suffer physical, mental and financial abuse so that they can combat their vulnerable situation.

Aadarsh - Save Youth, Save Nation 

In 2019, the "Aadarsh - Save Youth, Save Nation" project was designed to educate boys and girls in schools about several issues that arise in puberty. Sexual harassment and abuse as well as the dangers of the internet are also addressed in separate lessons.

Additionally, the trust runs the "No Bad Touch" project which educates children, teachers, and parents about child sexual abuse. Sambhali is currently the only organisation in Rajasthan to openly address this issue. The "No Bad Touch" project was launched in June 2013 and over 3,000 children per year attend the workshops.

Sambhali Trust during COVID-19

During the lockdown in 2020, Govind Singh Rathore's family and some people from the NGO moved to his village Setrawa. There, most of the people work in mines as laborers and were hit badly by the total lockdown. In the strong summer heat of the Indian Thar Desert, some women walked miles to ask the trust for any possible help. 

By the end of March 2020, the NGO started to distribute food packages including flour, rice, chili, turmeric & chai powder, sugar, salt, oil & lentils to 22 tribal families around the family home. A few days after, the Trust established its new project and helped more than 500 families by delivering 2,300 ration kits in 12 villages of Dechu Tehsil from the end of March until the end of July. 

Additionally, more than 2,000 masks were and are still delivered to people in need, police officers, and laborers in the desert and Jodhpur. 

Around 1,500 additional families were informed about COVID-19 and were given soaps & masks by our international and national volunteers who went into the field. 

Even though the main deliveries stopped by the end of June, Sambhali is still supporting 22 vulnerable families with food rations for 15 days and is using its Nirbhaya toll-free helpline number for this matter as well. During the extreme lockdown, the NGO’s headquarters was offered to the local administration in Jodhpur for isolation camps and shelters.

References

13. Times of India from 15.04.2020: Jodhpur man vacates house for isolation centre https://timesofindia.indiatimes.com/city/jodhpur/jodhpur-man-vacates-house-for-isolation-centre/articleshow/75149661.cms

14. CNN from 04.06.2020: Sambhali Trust during COVID-19 lockdown https://edition.cnn.com/2020/06/04/india/india-lockdown-food-coronavirus-intl/index.html

15. BBC from 31.03.2020: I'm in lockdown with my abuser https://www.bbc.com/news/world-52063755

16. Times of India from 07.09.2020: Jodhpur women distribute free masks risking their own health https://timesofindia.indiatimes.com/city/jodhpur/women-distribute-free-masks-risking-their-own-health/articleshow/77967970.cms

External links
 Official Website
 Volunteering at Sambhali Trust
 Supporting Sambhali Trust
 Annual Report 2020/21
 Annual Report 2019/20
 Annual Report 2018/19
 Annual Report 2017/18

Non-profit organisations based in India
Women in India
Organisations based in Jodhpur
2007 establishments in Rajasthan
Organizations established in 2007